Stuttgart High School (SHS) is an English-language high school in southwest Germany, in Baden-Württemberg. Southwest of Stuttgart on Panzer Kaserne in Böblingen, it is operated by the United States' DODEA (formerly known as DoDDS).

Opened in 2014, its enrollment is primarily dependents of military, civilian, and contract employees of the U.S. Department of Defense (DOD) who are assigned to units of the Stuttgart Military Community, which includes Patch Barracks, Robinson Barracks, Panzer Kaserne, and Kelley Barracks.

It succeeded Patch American High School (1979–2015, on Patch Barracks), and SHS remains the only DoDEA (DoDDS) high school in the Stuttgart area. Patch's school history, panther mascot, and colors were carried over to Stuttgart; black and gold are also the colors of host state Baden-Württemberg.

Another predecessor, Stuttgart American High School (SAHS), began in 1954 at Robinson Barracks, relocated to Pattonville two years later, and closed in 1993.

Academics
The school offers the same classes typical of a high school in the United States.

Courses are offered in a variety of fields:
English (AP English Language, AP English Literature, and Honors courses are also offered)
Mathematics (Algebra I, Geometry, Algebra II, AP Statistics, Pre-Calculus, AP Calculus, and others)
Science (Physics, Chemistry, Anatomy, Biology, etc.)
Foreign Languages (German,  Spanish)
Career and Technical (Computer programming, web design, accounting, finance, etc., including AP Computer Science)
Fine Arts (humanities,  art, band (advanced, intermediate, beginning), chorus, show choir, jazz band, string ensemble)
Social Studies (Government, U.S. History, AP U.S. History, AP U.S. Government, AP World History, AP Human Geography, etc.)
Army JROTC (8th Battalion)
25 AP class offerings

Administration
The current principal is Rick Renninger, with assistant principals Vince Power and Miata Coleman.

Sports
Stuttgart High School has a large variety of sports including:
Football 
Tennis
Cross Country 
Track
Golf 
Soccer 
Baseball 
Softball
Wrestling
Drill team (JROTC students only)
Rifle team (JROTC students only)

Including its time as Patch, the Panthers have previously won European Champdionships within DoDEA including rifle, drill, cross country, football, and wrestling. The rifle team is currently second in all of Army JROTC and is home to the second place individual marksman in all of Army JROTC.

Extra-curricular activities
Zeitgeist Yearbook 
Several honor societies including:
National Honor Society 
Spanish Honor Society 
English Honor Society 
German Honor Society 
Quill and Scroll Honor Society 
Thespian Honor Society 
Mu Alpha Theta 
Model United Nations 
Future Business Leaders of America (FBLA)
Bavaria District (DoDDS-Europe)

References

External links
 Official School website
 DODEA Webpage
 Patch Sports Clips
 Greater Stuttgart DoDDS High Schools Alumni Association

American international schools in Germany
High schools in Germany
International schools in Baden-Württemberg
Schools in Stuttgart
United States military in Stuttgart
Department of Defense Education Activity
Educational institutions established in 2015
2015 establishments in Germany